Farcimen tortum is a species of a land snail, terrestrial gastropod mollusk in the family Megalomastomatidae.

Distribution 
This species is found in Cuba.

Ecology 
Farcimen tortum is a ground dwelling species.

Predators of Farcimen tortum include larvae of firefly bug Alecton discoidalis.

References

Megalomastomatidae
Endemic fauna of Cuba